San Luis Peak is the highest summit of the La Garita Mountains range in the Rocky Mountains of North America. It is situated rather far to the east of the other fourteeners in the San Juans, and has more of a wilderness setting than many of the others.

San Luis Peak is a relatively straightforward climb, with two hiking routes to the summit. The Northeast Ridge route begins at the Stewart Creek Trailhead and is  round trip. The South Ridge route begins at the West Willow Creek Trailhead north of Creede. This route is almost entirely above treeline and is  round trip.

See also

List of mountain peaks of North America
List of mountain peaks of the United States
List of mountain peaks of Colorado
List of Colorado fourteeners

References

External links

 
 

Fourteeners of Colorado
Mountains of Saguache County, Colorado
San Juan Mountains (Colorado)
North American 4000 m summits
Rio Grande National Forest
Mountains of Colorado